Planchón-Peteroa is a complex volcano extending in a north–south direction along the border between Argentina and Chile. It consists of volcanoes of various ages with several overlapping calderas. Those include Volcán Planchón, Volcán Peteroa and Volcán Azufre.

A partial collapse of the complex about 11,500 years ago produced a major debris avalanche, which followed the course of the Teno River until reaching the Chile Central Valley.

Peteroa has a crater lake. Lagunas de Teno lies at the foot of Planchón volcano. In this area also is the Vergara International Pass.

September 6, 2010 eruption

Planchón-Peteroa Volcano erupted on September 6, followed by a stronger eruption on September 18. On September 21, the volcano erupted once again, emitting a dark gray plume of volcanic ash. As winds blew the ash southeast into Argentina, residents there were warned by authorities to evacuate the nearby areas before Planchón-Peteroa would erupt again.

See also
 List of volcanoes in Argentina
 List of volcanoes in Chile
 Descabezado Grande
 Las Leñas

References 

Mountains of Argentina
Mountains of Chile
Complex volcanoes
Active volcanoes
Volcanic crater lakes
Calderas of Argentina
Calderas of Chile
Volcanoes of Maule Region
Volcanoes of Mendoza Province
Polygenetic volcanoes
Argentina–Chile border
International mountains of South America